The Bahamas, officially the Commonwealth of The Bahamas, competed at the 2016 Summer Olympics in Rio de Janeiro, Brazil, from 5 to 21 August 2016. The nation's participation at these Games marked its seventeenth appearance as an independent nation.

The Bahamas Olympic Committee sent a total of 28 athletes, 19 men and 9 women, to the Games, participating in athletics, swimming, and rowing. Eleven of them had previously competed in London 2012, with Chris Brown leading the men's 4 × 400 m relay squad for the nation's title defense at his fifth consecutive Olympics. Other notable athletes from the Bahamian team featured triple jumper and Beijing 2008 bronze medalist Leevan Sands, swimmer Arianna Vanderpool-Wallace, who rounded out the top eight from London in the women's 50 m freestyle, and sprinter Shaunae Miller, who served as the nation's flag bearer in the opening ceremony.

Bahamas left Rio de Janeiro with two medals awarded to the nation's track and field athletes. Among the medalists were the men's 4 × 400 m relay squad, highlighted by Brown and his fellow sprinters Michael Mathieu and Demetrius Pinder, and Miller, who sprang an upset over American top sprinter Allyson Felix with a head-first dive to earn the first gold medal awarded to a Bahamian athlete since Tonique Williams-Darling topped the podium in 2004.

Medalists

Athletics (track and field)

Bahamian athletes have so far achieved qualifying standards in the following athletics events (up to a maximum of 3 athletes in each event):

A total of 24 athletes (18 men and 6 women) were selected to the Bahamian track and field roster as part of the nation's official team announcement on 21 July 2016, with Chris Brown racing in the 400 metres and leading the men's relay squad at his fifth straight Olympics.

Track & road events
Men

Women

Field events

Rowing

For the first time in Olympic history, Bahamas has qualified one boat in the women's single sculls for the Games at the 2016 Latin American Continental Qualification Regatta in Valparaiso, Chile.

Qualification Legend: FA=Final A (medal); FB=Final B (non-medal); FC=Final C (non-medal); FD=Final D (non-medal); FE=Final E (non-medal); FF=Final F (non-medal); SA/B=Semifinals A/B; SC/D=Semifinals C/D; SE/F=Semifinals E/F; QF=Quarterfinals; R=Repechage

Swimming
 
Bahamian swimmers have so far achieved qualifying standards in the following events (up to a maximum of 2 swimmers in each event at the Olympic Qualifying Time (OQT), and potentially 1 at the Olympic Selection Time (OST)):

See also
Bahamas at the 2015 Pan American Games

References

External links 
 
 

Nations at the 2016 Summer Olympics
2016
Olympics